Potiskum is the largest city in Yobe State and originally the town has about three major tribes which include a Ngizim, bolawa and kara-kare.

History 
The city of Potiskum is an abode to the most organised traditional and community administration known as Fika Emirate. Historically, what is known as Fika Emirate with headquarters in Potiskum was the brain child of the British Colonialists who harnessed the indigenous tribes in the area namely, Kare-Kare, Ngizim, Ngamo, Bolewa, Fulani and Hausa to form a Central Administration.

Emir of Pataskum 
The current Emir of Pataskum is Mai Umar Ibn Wuriwa Bauya Lai-Lai.

Government 

List of wards in Potiskum

Economy 
Potiskum has been a thriving trade hegemony in Yobe State because of its strategic position as a centre of commerce, learning, spiritual and cultural revival. People from neighbouring Borno, Jigawa, Kano, Bauchi and Gombe States, and numerous others from Niger, Chad, Cameroon, Benin and Central African Republic have stakes in the ‘biggest cattle market in sub-Saharan Africa,’ which is situated in Potiskum. And also have one of the biggest correctional facilities in Nigeria.

Therefore, Potiskum is known for the following markets:

Potiskum Cow Market 
Potiskum is the largest city in Yobe State with booming business in the area. It has one of the largest cattle market in Africa and the largest in West Africa. Most of the cattle are transported to other parts of the country.

Landscape 
It had an area of

Population 
As of 2006, the population of Potiskum was 156,859. In 2022, the population of Potiskum stands at 483,346.

Notable people 
 Idris Alkali, former chief of administration, army headquarters
 Baba idi Potiskum
Lamba Shua'ibu
Alhaji Idi Wadina Lailai
Alhaji Baba Adi
Imrana Alhaji Buba
Alhaji Maina Waziri
Alhaji Mamman Farafara
Alhaji Idi Jigu-jigu
Lamba Sabo
Lamba Dogo Nini
Alhaji Abban Jalo
Alhaji Guragusko

Potiskum airstrip 
Potiskum Airstrip is located in city's GRA from the western part of the town along Kano road. The Nigerian Airspace Management Agency (NAMA) office in the field, which is supposed to be responsible for the transmission of air traffic information to aircraft flying over the airfield, is not fully functional as the Omni-Directional Range Equipment installed there was not equipped with computers to enable the workers scientifically spot planes hovering over Potiskum. The airport came into being during the scramble for Africa by the colonialists because Potiskum was a sprawling town in the north which was earlier annexed by Germany before the United Kingdom took over. The aim of constructing the airport was to make the movements of the white men in and out of Potiskum easy because the town was also the gateway to other nearby towns in the north, which had enhanced trading activities and other associated commercial services in the region.

Boko Haram attacks 
In July 2009, Boko Haram members set a police station on fire during their uprising.

A May 2012 attack on the cattle market killed over 34 people, but appeared to be an attack by criminals seeking revenge, and not Boko Haram.

On 25 December 2012, a mass shooting occurred at a church.

On 3 November 2014, at least 30 people were killed in a suicide bombing at a Shia Muslim religious procession at Faydia Islamic school. Yobe State Governor Ibrahim Gaidam promised members of the Islamic Movement in Nigeria (ISMN) that he would demand full investigation of allegations of shootings of its members by soldiers deployed to the scene of the attack.

On 6 November 2014, sixteen men arrested by Nigerian Army soldiers were "found dead of bullet wounds hours later." (Another source puts the number at eighteen.)

On 10 November 2014 at least 46 boys were killed and 79 wounded, by a suicide bomber during a student assembly at the Government Science Secondary School."

On 11 January 2015, four people were killed and over 40 were injured at Kasuwar Jagwal GSM market after an attack by two female suicide bombers, one of whom appeared to be about 15 years old.  A bombing involving a parked car also occurred that day, killing two people and injuring one, at the Divisional Police Station.

On 13 January 2015, Governor Ibrahim Gaidam condemned the attacks, and "proposed the establishment of an Emergency Response Centre at the General Hospital in Potiskum." He stated that the medical bills for those injured in the attack would be paid, including for the injured who had been transferred to other hospitals for treatment.

On 22 and 24 February 2015, suicide bombers killed 22 people.

On 5 July 2015, six people were killed in a suicide bombing.

Demographics 
Potiksum is Projected to be the seventh fastest growing city on the African continent between 2020 and 2025, with a 5.65% growth.

See also 
 List of Local Government Areas in Yobe State

References